Tuscalee (foaled 1960) was an American Thoroughbred racehorse that competed in both flat racing and steeplechase events from 1962 through 1972 for owner and breeder Alfred H. Smith Sr. The gelded son of Tuscany began his career racing on the flat with only modest success but as a steeplechase competitor became a National Champion in 1966 and finish his career having won more American steeplechase races than any horse in history. Tuscalee would be inducted into the U. S. Racing Hall of Fame and the Maryland Thoroughbred Hall of Fame. As at 2018, Tuscalee's American record of 37 Steeplechase wins still stands.

Background 
Tuscalee was a bay gelding born in 1960. His sire was Tuscany, a multiple stakes winning horse whose wins included the Rumson Handicap, Toboggan Handicap and the Salvator Mile Handicap.

Racing career

Flat career 
He started his racing career as a flat racing horse, but only won once in 8 flat races as a 3-year-old. After winning a second time as a 4-year-old, he was switched to steeplechase racing under the care of trainer Leiter Aitcheson.

Steeplechase career 
Tuscalee had 7 steeplechase victories in his 4-year-old-season, 2 wins as a 5-year-old and 10 wins as a 6-year-old. To this day, his third steeplechase season is still a record for the most wins in a season for a steeplechaser. For the rest of his career, he performed more moderately. His career ended at the age of 12 when he won his 4th and final National Hunt Cup, giving him his 37th steeplechase victory and his 39th overall victory.

After retirement 
Tuscalee was inducted into United States Racing Hall of Fame in 2013.

See also
 List of historical horses

References 

 http://thisishorseracing.com/news/index.php/this-is-horse-racing/2020-hall-call-mcdynamo-tuscalee-joins-greats
 https://www.racingmuseum.org/hall-of-fame/tuscalee
 http://mdthoroughbredhalloffame.com/cms/index.php/the-horses/class-of-2014/tuscalee
 http://www.drf.com/news/hall-fame-profile-tuscalee
 http://www.bloodhorse.com/horse-racing/articles/115495/concern-tuscalee-inducted-into-maryland-hall
 http://www.bloodhorse.com/horse-racing/articles/119528/hall-of-fame-tuscalee-takes-a-bow

1960 racehorse births
American steeplechase racehorses
Racehorses bred in Maryland
Racehorses trained in the United States
United States Thoroughbred Racing Hall of Fame inductees